Georges Miller (13 December 1906 – 5 February 1979) was a wrestler from Luxembourg. He competed at the 1928 Summer Olympics.

References

External links
 

1906 births
1979 deaths
Olympic wrestlers of Luxembourg
Wrestlers at the 1928 Summer Olympics
Luxembourgian male sport wrestlers
Place of birth missing